Noam Cohen is an American journalist. He was a technology columnist and author of the "Link by Link" column for The New York Times from 2007 to 2013. He is the author of the 2017 nonfiction book The Know-It-Alls: The Rise of Silicon Valley as a Political Powerhouse and Social Wrecking Ball, about the politics of Silicon Valley. His work has also appeared in Wired magazine. He is a Wikipedia editor.

Cohen was a history major in college. He lives in Brooklyn, New York.

Bibliography 

 The Know-It-Alls: The Rise of Silicon Valley as a Political Powerhouse and Social Wrecking Ball, The New Press 2017. ,

References

External links 
 
 

Living people
21st-century American journalists
21st-century American male writers
American male journalists
American technology writers
The New York Times people
Wired (magazine) people
Year of birth missing (living people)